Green Cove is a bay in the U.S. state of Washington.

Green Cove was so named on account of the green foliage lining the bay.

References

Landforms of Thurston County, Washington
Bays of Washington (state)